The year 1811 in science and technology involved some significant events, listed below.

Astronomy
 March 25 – Great Comet discovered by Honoré Flaugergues.

Biology
 Johann Karl Wilhelm Illiger publishes Prodromus systematis mammalium et avium, an updating of Linnean taxonomy and a major influence on the concept of the 'Family' in biology. He first defines the infraclass Marsupialia.
 Peter Simon Pallas begins publication of Zoographia rosso-Asiatica, sistens omnium animalium in extenso Imperio rossico, et adjacentibus maribus observatorum recensionem, domicilia, mores et descriptiones, anatomen atque icones plurimorum in Saint Petersburg.

Chemistry
 Bernard Courtois discovers iodine.
 Joseph Louis Gay-Lussac and Louis Jacques Thénard publish Recherches Physico-Chimiques, faites sur la pile; sur la préparation chimique et les propriétés du potassium et du sodium; sur la décomposition de l'acide boracique; sur les acides fluorique, muriatique et muriatique oxigéné; sur l'action chimique de la lumière; sur l'analyse végétale et animale, etc. in Paris.
 Amedeo Avogadro proposes Avogadro's law, that equal volumes of gases under constant temperature and pressure contain equal number of molecules.

Earth sciences
 June 10 – A volcanic eruption, observed from British sloop , briefly creates Sabrina Island (Azores).

Mathematics
 Carl Friedrich Gauss works with functions of complex number variables.
 S. D. Poisson publishes Traité de mécanique (vol. 1).

Medicine
 Charles Bell publishes An Idea of a New Anatomy of the Brain, starting to distinguish between sensory and motor nerves.
 Abraham Colles publishes A Treatise on Surgical Anatomy in Dublin.
 Francis Place publishes Illustrations and Proofs of the Principles of Population, including an examination of the proposed remedies of Mr. Malthus, and a reply to the objections of Mr. Godwin and others in London, the first significant text in English to advocate contraception.

Paleontology
 Mary Anning discovers the fossilised remains of an Ichthyosaur at Lyme Regis.

Physics
 Amedeo Avogadro proposes his hypothesis relating volumes and numbers of molecules of gases.

Technology
 Friedrich Koenig, with the assistance of Andreas Friedrich Bauer, produces the first steam printing press, in London.

Awards
 Copley Medal: Benjamin Brodie

Births
 March 2 – Hugh Edwin Strickland, English geologist and ornithologist (died 1853)
 March 11
 Lady Katherine Sophia Kane née Baily, Irish botanist (died 1886)
 Urbain Le Verrier, French astronomer (died 1877)
 March 30 – Robert Bunsen, German chemist (died 1899)
 July 13 – James Young, Scottish chemist (died 1883)
 September 14 – William Budd, English physician and epidemiologist (died 1880)
 October 25 – Évariste Galois, French mathematician (died 1832)
 John Waterston, Scottish physicist and civil engineer (died 1883)

Deaths
 February 9 – Nevil Maskelyne, English Astronomer Royal (born 1732)
 August 31 – Louis Antoine de Bougainville, French explorer (born 1729)
 September 8 – Peter Simon Pallas, German-born naturalist (born 1741)

References

 
19th century in science
1810s in science